Alhambra (from "Alhambra")  is a city located in the western San Gabriel Valley region of Los Angeles County, California, United States, approximately eight miles from the Downtown Los Angeles civic center. It was incorporated on July 11, 1903. As of the 2020 census, the population was 82,868. The city's ZIP Codes are 91801 and 91803 (plus 91802 for P.O. boxes).

History 
The original inhabitants of the land where Alhambra now sits are the Tongva.

The San Gabriel Mission was founded nearby on September 8, 1771, as part of the Spanish conquest and occupation of Alta California. The land that would later become Alhambra was part of a 300,000 acre land grant given to Manuel Nieto, a soldier from the Los Angeles Presidio. In 1820 Mexico won its independence from the Spanish crown and lands once ruled by them became part of the Mexican Republic. These lands then transferred into the hands of the United States following the defeat in the Mexican–American War. A wealthy developer, Benjamin Davis Wilson, married Ramona Yorba, daughter of Bernardo Yorba, who owned the land which would become Alhambra. With the persuasion of his daughter, Ruth, Yorba named the land after a book she was reading, Washington Irving's Tales of the Alhambra, which he was inspired to write by his extended visit to the Alhambra palace in Granada, Spain. Alhambra was founded as a suburb of Los Angeles that remained an unincorporated area during the mid-19th century. The first school in Alhambra was Ramona Convent Secondary School, built on hillside property donated by the prominent James de Barth Shorb family. Thirteen years before the city was incorporated, several prominent San Gabriel Valley families interested in the Catholic education of their daughters established the school in 1890. The city's first public high school, Alhambra High School, was established in 1898, five years before the city's incorporation. On July 11, 1903, the City of Alhambra was incorporated. The Alhambra Fire Department was established in 1906.

Alhambra is promoted as a "city of homes", and many of its homes have historical significance. They include styles such as craftsman, bungalow, Spanish Mediterranean, Spanish colonial, Italian beaux-arts, and arts and crafts. Twenty-six single-family residential areas have been designated historic neighborhoods by the city, including the Bean Tract (formerly owned by early resident Jacob Bean), the Midwick Tract (site of the former Midwick Country Club), the Airport Tract (formerly the landing pad for Alhambra Airport), and the Emery Park area. There are also a large number of condominiums, rental apartments, and mixed-use residential/commercial buildings, especially in the downtown area.

Alhambra's main business district, at the intersection of Main and Garfield, has been a center of commerce since 1895. By the 1950s, it had taken on an upscale look and was "the" place to go in the San Gabriel Valley. While many of the classic historical buildings have been torn down over the years, the rebuilding of Main Street has led to numerous dining, retail, and entertainment establishments. Alhambra has experienced waves of new immigrants, beginning with Italians in the 1950s, Mexicans in the 1960s, and Chinese in the 1980s. As a result, a very active Chinese business district has developed on Valley Boulevard, including Chinese supermarkets, restaurants, shops, banks, realtors, and medical offices. The Valley Boulevard corridor has become a national hub for many Asian-owned bank headquarters, and there are other nationally recognised retailers in the city.

The historic Garfield Theatre, located at Valley Boulevard and Garfield Avenue from 1925 until 2001, was formerly a vaudeville venue and is rumored to have hosted the Gumm Sisters, featuring a very young Judy Garland. Faded from its original glory, for its last few years it was purchased and ran Chinese-language films, and in 2001 went out of business. Subsequently, developers have remodeled the dilapidated building, turning it into a vibrant commercial center with many Chinese stores and eateries.

In 2003, actress Lana Clarkson was shot to death in the Alhambra home of record producer Phil Spector. Spector lived in Alhambra's largest and most notable residence, the Pyrenees Castle, built in 1926. In 2009, Spector was convicted of second-degree murder in connection with Clarkson's death.

Geography 
Alhambra is bordered by South Pasadena on the northwest, San Marino on the north, San Gabriel on the east, Monterey Park on the south, and the Los Angeles districts of Monterey Hills and El Sereno on the west.

Demographics 

As of 2020, Alhambra had a population of 82,868. Approximately 51% of residents were Asian, 23% were White (9% non-Hispanic White), 2.2% were African American, 0.5% Native American, 0.3% Pacific Islander, 3.0% from two or more races. Hispanic or Latino of any race were 36%. Alhambra is among the communities in L.A. County with the highest percentage of Asian residents. Chinese and Mexican are the most common ancestries in Alhambra.

As of 2020, 17% of Alhambra residents were under 18 years old, and 18% were 65 or older.

During 2009–2013, Alhambra had a median household income of $54,148, with 13.9% of the population living below the federal poverty line. Approximately 40% of the city's housing units were owner-occupied as of 2015–2019.

Government

Local government 
The city is governed by a five-member city council; one member of the council is chosen as mayor. Council members are nominated by district and elected for four-year terms. Half of the council seats are up for election in each even-numbered year, which is held in a Tuesday after the first Monday in November during the California general election. The City Manager is appointed by the City Council and oversees the day-to-day operations of ten City departments, 400 employees and a $145M budget. The current City Manager, Jessica Binnquist was appointed in 2018.

State and federal 

Transportation
The San Bernardino Freeway (I-10) runs through the city's southern portions, and the Long Beach Freeway (I-710) has its northern terminus at Valley Boulevard in the far southwestern portions of the city. Major thoroughfares within the city include Atlantic and Valley Boulevards, Mission Road, Fremont and Garfield Avenues, and Main Street.

Public transportation in Alhambra is provided by the Los Angeles County Metropolitan Transportation Authority (Metro) as well as the Alhambra Community Transit.

The California High-Speed Rail Authority is considering proposals to a build high-speed rail system through Alhambra along the San Bernardino Freeway (I-10) corridor from the east city limits to west city limits. In late July 2010, the authority told the city that the options under consideration included building tracks down the center of the freeway and parallel to the freeway along Ramona Road. As proposed, there would be a  deck set on top of  posts placed every . The proposal is part of the high-speed rail network currently planned for California. It is part of the line between Los Angeles's Union Station and San Diego, through the Inland Empire. Residents and city leaders voiced opposition to the plan to route the high-speed trains through the city in public meetings.

Media 
The local daily newspaper is the San Gabriel Valley Tribune. The regional daily newspaper is the Los Angeles Times.

Around Alhambra is a local community paper published monthly by the Alhambra Chamber of Commerce.

Alhambra Source was a hyperlocal, online-only news site operated from 2010 to 2020.

The Alhambra Post-Advocate is the newspaper of general circulation adjudicated for the City of Alhambra and County of Los Angeles. It is currently published by the Wave Newspapers and is part of the Wave's East Edition.

Economy
Car dealerships are the largest contributor to the local economy. Many car brands can be found in Alhambra, such as Acura, BMW, Honda, Nissan, Toyota, Ford, KIA, Volkswagen, Dodge, Jeep and Chrysler. Most of these dealerships are found on the Main St. auto row near Atlantic Boulevard.

In recent years there has been an effort to revitalize Main St. from Atlantic Blvd. to Garfield Ave. Many new restaurants have been opening on Main St. as well as development of mixed-use buildings that have provided opportunities for more businesses to open and provide jobs, such as the new Sprouts farmers market.

The Hat, a local icon, was opened in Alhambra in 1951. It was the original, family-owned outdoor restaurant, and is now a well-known small Southern California chain. Shakey's Pizza also has its headquarters in Alhambra.

Top employers
According to the City of Alhambra 2020 Comprehensive Annual Financial Report for the year ended June 2020, the city's top employers were:

Notable Associations
The Serbian Orthodox Eparchy of Western America has its headquarters in Alhambra.

Landmarks

 Alhambra Place Shopping Center (Main Street and Garfield Avenue)
 Almansor Park
 Dupuy's Pyrenees Castle (Grandview Drive)
 Edwards Stadium Cinemas (Edwards Alhambra Renaissance Stadium 14 and IMAX)
 Fosselman's Ice Cream - An old-fashioned ice cream shop
 Garfield Theatre (Valley Boulevard and Garfield Avenue), originally the Valley Grand Building
 Gateway Plaza Monument (Valley Boulevard and Fremont Avenue)
 LA County Public Works building (Fremont and Commonwealth), previously Sears Western Corporate Offices
 Granada Park
 Ramona Convent
 Renaissance Plaza (Main Street and Garfield Avenue)
 Southern California Edison (501 S. Marengo Ave.) 
 The Hat sign (Valley Boulevard and Garfield Avenue)
 Wing Lung Bank, Los Angeles Branch building that had the largest glass tile mural in North America until 2008
 All Souls World Language Catholic School, the only dual track, Mandarin and Spanish, in the country

Annual events
Each year on Valley Boulevard, the cities of Alhambra and San Gabriel used to co-host the San Gabriel Valley Lunar New Year Parade and Festival, which ran from Del Mar to Garfield Avenues. The event was of such significance to the majority Asian American demographic in Alhambra that it was broadcast live on Chinese radio, KWRM AM 1370, locally on KSCI-18, and later on worldwide cable and satellite TV. Now Alhambra alone runs the event within city limits without the parade.

From 2001 to 2008, Alhambra was the host of the Summer Jubilee, a street carnival and music concert held every Saturday, until its postponement due to loss of funds caused by the late 2000s recession.

Education 

Alhambra is home to the Los Angeles campus of Platt College and the Los Angeles Campus of Alliant International University. The University of Southern California has a Health Sciences Alhambra campus, which hosts the university's Institute for Health Promotion and Disease Prevention Research (IPR), and its master's degree program in public health.

Primary and secondary schools 
Almost all of the city is within the Alhambra Unified School District. The district's public elementary and middle schools (K–8) located in Alhambra are Martha Baldwin, Emery Park, Fremont, Garfield, Granada, Marguerita, William Northrup, Park, and Ramona. Additionally a small part of the city is assigned to Monterey Highlands K-8 in Monterey Park. The public high schools in Alhambra are: Alhambra High School, founded in 1898; Century High School; Independence High School; Mark Keppel High School; and San Gabriel High School (which, despite its name, is located within Alhambra).

Historic Ramona Convent Secondary School is a Catholic all-girls college preparatory school for grades 7–12 in Alhambra. Its first building was dedicated at Ramona Acres on January 29, 1890.

Other sectarian schools in the city include St. Therese (Catholic, grades K–8), St. Thomas More Elementary (Catholic, K–8), All Souls World Language Catholic School (Catholic, K–8), and Emmaus Lutheran (Lutheran, PK–8). Nonsectarian private schools include Oneonta Montessori School (grades PK–6), Sherman School (10–12), Bell Tower School (PS-5) and Leeway School (3–12).

See also 

List of people from Alhambra, California
Largest cities in Southern California
List of largest California cities by population

References

External links

 
 Alhambra Library
 Alhambra Chamber of Commerce

 
1903 establishments in California
Cities in Los Angeles County, California
Communities in the San Gabriel Valley
Incorporated cities and towns in California
Populated places established in 1903